The Norfolk and Western A was a class of 43 2-6-6-4 steam locomotives built by the railroad's own Roanoke Shops between 1936 and 1950 and operated until the late 1950s. The locomotives hauled fast and heavy freight trains for the railroad and only one has been preserved, No. 1218.

History

Upon delivery on the class starting in 1936, starting with 1200 and 1201, they were tested and proved successful. The railroad was satisfied with the class and bought eight more the following year. During testing, N&W officials were very impressed with their performance, as they were capable of pulling 4,800 tons at 25 mph on a 0.5% grade and 7,500 tons at 64 mph on level track. During World War II, the railroad built 25 more "A"s between 1943 and 1944 and finally eight more between 1949 and 1950. They were some of the last mainline steam locomotives to be put into service.

The locomotives had a cast-steel frame and Timken roller bearings on nearly every surface. The last five had McGill MultiRol roller bearings in the side and main rods, making them the only articulateds to take such friction-reducing measures. They were assigned to freight service and have pulled slower heavy freight trains as well as fast time freight. They were rated at 13,000 tons of drag freight between Williamson, West Virginia and Portsmouth, Ohio, and could reach speeds up to 42 mph pulling such a load. Between Portsmouth and Columbus, Ohio, they were rated at 5,200 tons of fast freight and could reach 65 mph. On passenger runs, they could reach 70 mph. Over the Kenova District, the railroad increased the "A"'s slow freight tonnage ratings from 13,000 to 14,500 tons. To reduce the amount of stops for water, they ran with auxiliary tenders with capacities of up to 20,800 gallons of water. This also increased gross ton-miles per train hour (GTM) 31% on the 112-mile Kenova District between Williamson and Portsmouth, Ohio.

In 1952, the N&W tested one of the "A"s and Y6b-class locomotives against a four-unit Electro-Motive Division (at that time, of General Motors) F7 diesel set. The tests indicated that fuel costs and similar items were roughly the same, and the test was considered a tie. However, diesels eventually won out for lower maintenance and other operational costs. As successful as the class was, diesels eventually replaced them. Retirement started in 1958 and by 1959, all of the "A"s had been retired.

Preservation

Only one "A" has been preserved, No. 1218. It was retired in 1959 and the same year, it was purchased by the Union Carbide Co. in Charleston, West Virginia, where it was used as a stationary boiler at a chemical plant. In 1965, it was repurchased by New England millionaire F. Nelson Blount for his locomotive collection at Steamtown, U.S.A. in Bellows Falls, Vermont. Three years later, its former owner Norfolk & Western did a cosmetic restoration on 1218 at their East End Shops in Roanoke, Virginia (the same place where it was built). After that, it was put on display at the Roanoke Transportation Museum in 1971. It was restored and operated in excursion service for the Norfolk Southern steam program between 1987 and 1991 and went for an overhaul. The program was then canceled in 1994 and the locomotive was eventually put back on display at the Virginia Museum of Transportation in Roanoke, Virginia. It is the only surviving 2-6-6-4 steam locomotive in the world.

Roster

References

Bibliography

2-6-6-4 locomotives
Simple articulated locomotives
A
Standard gauge locomotives of the United States
Freight locomotives
Railway locomotives introduced in 1936
Preserved steam locomotives of Virginia